Christianity is the predominant religion in Republic of the Congo.

Different sources give varying population figures for various denominations. According to the CIA World Factbook, the people of the Republic of the Congo are largely a mix of Catholics (33.3%), Awakening/Revival churches (22.3%) and other Protestants (19.9%). Followers of Islam make up 1.6%, primarily due to an influx of foreign workers into the urban centers.

According to the Association of Religion Data Archives, 52.9% is Catholic, 35.6% is Protestant (10.6% Pentecostal, 16.7% other Protestants, and 8.3% other and unknown Christian), 4.7% practice Ethnoreligions (Animism, Shamanism), 2.3% are members of other religions, 3.0% is not affiliated with any religion, and 1.4% do not know.

Most Muslim workers in urban centers are immigrants from West Africa and Lebanon, with some also from North Africa. The West African immigrants arrived mostly from Mali, Benin, Togo, Mauritania, and Senegal. The Lebanese are primarily Sunni Muslims. There are also 6,000 followers of the Ahmadiyya school of Islam in the country.

A small minority of Christians practice Kimbanguism, a syncretistic movement that originated in the neighboring Democratic Republic of the Congo. While retaining many elements of Christianity, Kimbanguism also recognizes its founder (Simon Kimbangu) as a prophet and incorporates African traditional beliefs, such as ancestor worship.

References